The French Connection or French Connection may refer to:

 French Connection, a heroin trafficking scheme

In literature and film 
 The French Connection (book), a 1969 non-fiction book about the drug trafficking scheme
 The French Connection (film), a 1971 film based on the book
 French Connection II, the sequel to the 1971 film
 The French Connection (The O.C.), a 2007 episode of The O.C. television series
 The Connection (2014 action film), a 2014 French-Belgian action crime thriller film directed by Cédric Jimenez

In music 
 French Connection (album), a 2009 album by Kate Ryan
 French Connection, a 2009 mixtape by Frenchie
 French Connection Part 2, a 2010 mixtape by Frenchie

Other uses 
 French Connection (clothing), a UK-based clothing company, also branded as "FCUK" or "fcuk"
 French Connection (cocktail), a cocktail made with cognac and amaretto
 The French Connection (aerobatics), an aerobatic team
 The French Connection (ice hockey), nickname for a Buffalo Sabres line in the 1970s

See also
FCUK: Father Chitti Umaa Kaarthik, 2021 Indian film by Vidyasagar Raju